This is a list of the past and present Mayors of Melrose, Massachusetts.

References

Melrose